The General Services Administration (GSA) is an  independent agency of the United States government established in 1949 to help manage and support the basic functioning of federal agencies. GSA supplies products and communications for U.S. government offices, provides transportation and office space to federal employees, and develops government-wide cost-minimizing policies and other management tasks.

GSA employs about 12,000 federal workers. It has an annual operating budget of roughly $33 billion and oversees $66 billion of procurement annually. It contributes to the management of about $500 billion in U.S. federal property, divided chiefly among 8,700 owned and leased buildings and a 215,000 vehicle motor pool. Among the real estate assets it manages are the Ronald Reagan Building and International Trade Center in Washington, D.C., which is the largest U.S. federal building after the Pentagon.

GSA's business lines include the Federal Acquisition Service (FAS) and the Public Buildings Service (PBS), as well as several Staff Offices including the Office of Government-wide Policy, the Office of Small Business Utilization, and the Office of Mission Assurance. As part of FAS, GSA's Technology Transformation Services (TTS) helps federal agencies improve the delivery of information and services to the public. Key initiatives include the Presidential Innovation Fellows program, 18F (includes login.gov and cloud.gov), FedRAMP, the USAGov platform (USA.gov, GobiernoUSA.gov), Data.gov, and Challenge.gov, the U.S. Web Design System, and I.T. Modernization Centers of Excellence.

GSA is a member of the Procurement G6, an informal group leading the use of framework agreements and e-procurement instruments in public procurement.

History
In 1947, President Harry Truman asked former president Herbert Hoover to lead what became known as the Hoover Commission to make recommendations to reorganize the operations of the federal government. One of the commission's  recommendations was the establishment of an "Office of the General Services", to combine the responsibilities of the following organizations:
 U.S. Treasury Department's Bureau of Federal Supply
 U.S. Treasury Department's Office of Contract Settlement
 National Archives Establishment
 All functions of the Federal Works Agency, including the Public Buildings Administration and the Public Roads Administration
 War Assets Administration

GSA became an independent agency on July 1, 1949, after the passage of the Federal Property and Administrative Services Act. General Jess Larson, administrator of the War Assets Administration, was named GSA's first administrator.

The first job awaiting Administrator Larson and the newly formed GSA was a complete renovation of the White House. The structure had fallen into such a state of disrepair by 1949 that one inspector said it was standing "purely from habit". Larson later explained the total renovation in depth by saying, "In order to make the White House structurally sound, it was necessary to completely dismantle, and I mean completely dismantle, everything from the White House except the four walls, which were constructed of stone. Everything, except the four walls without a roof, was finally stripped down, and that's where the work started." GSA worked closely with President Truman and First Lady Bess Truman to ensure that the new agency's first major project would be a success. GSA completed the renovation in 1952.

In 1960, GSA created the Federal Telecommunications System, a government-wide intercity telephone system. In 1962 the Ad Hoc Committee on Federal Office Space created a new building program to address obsolete office buildings in Washington, D.C., resulting in the construction of many of the offices that now line Independence Avenue.

In 1970, the Nixon administration created the Consumer Product Information Coordinating Center, now part of USAGov. In 1974 the Federal Buildings Fund was initiated, allowing GSA to issue rent bills to federal agencies. In 1972 GSA established the Automated Data and Telecommunications Service, which later became the Office of Information Resources Management. In 1973 GSA created the Office of Federal Management Policy. GSA's Office of Acquisition Policy centralized procurement policy in 1978. GSA was initially responsible for emergency preparedness and stockpiling strategic materials to be used in wartime until those functions were transferred to the newly-created Federal Emergency Management Agency in 1979.

In 1984, GSA introduced the federal government to the use of charge cards, known as the GSA SmartPay system. The National Archives and Records Administration was spun off into an independent agency in 1985. The same year, GSA began providing government-wide policy oversight and guidance for federal real property management as a result of an executive order signed by President Ronald Reagan.

In 1986, GSA headquarters, U.S. General Services Administration Building, located at Eighteenth and F Streets, NW, was listed on the National Register of Historic Places, at the time serving as Interior Department offices.

In 2003, the Federal Protective Service, which secures GSA-managed (and other) buildings, was moved to the United States Department of Homeland Security. In 2005, GSA reorganized to merge the Federal Supply Service (FSS) and Federal Technology Service (FTS) business lines into the Federal Acquisition Service (FAS).

On April 3, 2009, President Barack Obama nominated Martha N. Johnson to serve as GSA Administrator. After a nine-month delay, the United States Senate confirmed her nomination on February 4, 2010. On April 2, 2012, Johnson resigned in the wake of a management-deficiency report that detailed improper payments for a 2010 "Western Regions" training conference held by the Public Buildings Service in Las Vegas.

In 2013, a result of the Open Government Initiative's instruction for federal agencies to open their activities to the public, GSA developed Data.gov to foster transparency and information sharing. That same year GSA also launched the Total Workplace initiative to modernize the workplace of federal agencies and increase efficiency, alongside the Presidential Innovation Fellows and the 18F programs. In 2016, the Acquisition Gateway and Making It Easier programs were launched to assist buyers from federal agencies in acquisitions, and to assist new companies in doing business with the government. Improvements were also made in the deliverance of digital government services with the creation of the Technology Transformation Services.

Controversies

Ted Weiss Federal Building controversy
In July 1991, GSA contractors began the excavation of what is now the Ted Weiss Federal Building in New York City. The planning for that building did not take into account the possibility of encountering the historic cemetery for colonial-era African New Yorkers located beneath the footprint of the $276 million office building. When initial excavation disturbed burials, destroying skeletons and artifacts, GSA sent archaeologists to excavate—but hid their findings from the public. Revelation of the discoveries led to 18 months of activism by African-descendant community members, public officials, academics, and concerned citizens. Ultimately, GSA made public amends by funding extensive scientific research under the auspices of Michael Blakey; creating a new subagency, the Office of Public Education and Interpretation; truncating the building plan; and funding public reports on the story of the African Burial Ground. The efforts led to the creation of a new unit of the National Park Service, The African Burial Ground National Monument, at the facility. GSA fully funded that portion of the National Park Service until 2010, when GSA's formal involvement with the African Burial Ground ceased.

Lurita Doan controversy
During President George W. Bush's Administration GSA Administrator, Lurita Doan, was forced to resign after GSA had awarded a sole source contract for $20,000 to her friend. Doan appeared to have violated the Hatch Act and was criticized for political activity while on the job. The investigating team recommended she be punished to the fullest extent, and she resigned soon after.

Western Regions Training Conference controversy
In 2012, U.S. Representative John Mica, chairman of the House Transportation and Infrastructure Committee, called for a congressional investigation into the misuse of federal money by GSA. Lawmakers accused GSA of "lavish spending" following the 2010 Western Regions Training Conference at the M Resort in Las Vegas.

GSA spent $823,000 in taxpayer money toward the October 2010 convention, including $100,405.37 spent on employee travel costs for a total of eight pre-planning meetings, scouting trips, and a "dry run". The report also found excessive spending for event planners, gifts for participants, and lavish meals.

The conference had been the most recent in a series of similar lavish conferences organized by regions of GSA's Public Buildings Service. In May 2010 GSA treated 120 interns to a five-day conference at a Palm Springs, California, resort. An additional investigation led by Inspector General Brian D. Miller found 115 missing Apple iPods meant for an employee rewards program.

GSA Administrator Martha N. Johnson resigned in the wake of the controversy. Before turning in her own resignation, Johnson fired two other GSA senior executives, Public Buildings Service head Robert Peck and senior advisor Stephen Leeds. Four PBS Regional Commissioners, who had been responsible for planning the conference, were placed on administrative leave.

Trump–Biden presidential transition controversy
After Joe Biden was called by media outlets as the President-Elect of the United States – defeating Donald Trump in the November 2020 election – Emily W. Murphy, the chief executive of the General Services Administration, initially refused to sign a letter authorizing Biden's transition team to begin work and access federal agencies and transition funds, according to The Washington Post. This came as Trump refused to concede Biden's presumptive – but not yet certified – victory and follow the norm of facilitating a peaceful transition of power to the presumptive winner. There are no firm rules on how the GSA determines the president-elect. Typically, the GSA chief might make the decision after reliable news organizations have declared the winner or following a concession by the loser. On November 23, 2020, Murphy issued the letter of ascertainment that meant the Trump administration was ready to begin the formal transition.

Organization

Structure
The administrator is a presidential political appointee and the chief executive of the General Services Administration. On April 12, 2021, President Joe Biden nominated Robin Carnahan to serve as administrator. She was confirmed by the US Senate on June 23, 2021.

GSA consists of two major services: the Federal Acquisition Service (FAS), and the Public Buildings Service (PBS). In addition to these two major services, the agency also consists of twelve staff offices and two independent offices. The FAS provides both strategic and operational support for acquisition of goods and services for other federal departments.

Past Administrators

Staff offices
 Office of Government-wide Policy
 Office of the Chief Financial Officer
 Office of Human Resources Management
 Office of GSA IT
 Office of Administrative Services
 Office of Congressional and Intergovernmental Affairs
 Office of Strategic Communication
 Office of Small Business Utilization
 Office of General Counsel
 Office of Civil Rights
 Office of Mission Assurance
 Office of Customer Experience

Independent offices
 Office of Inspector General
 Civilian Board of Contract Appeals

Regions
GSA conducts its business activities through 11 offices (known as GSA Regions) throughout the United States. These regional offices are located in Atlanta, Boston, Chicago, Denver, Fort Worth, Kansas City (Missouri), New York City, Philadelphia, San Francisco, Seattle (Auburn), and Washington, D.C.

Operations

Procurement and the GSA Schedule
The Federal Acquisition Service (FAS) provides products and services across the government. GSA assists with procurement work for other government agencies. As part of this effort, it maintains the large GSA Schedules, which other agencies can use to buy goods and services. The GSA Schedule can be thought of as a collection of pre-negotiated contracts. Procurement managers from government agencies can view these agreements and make purchases from the GSA Schedule knowing that all legal obligations have been taken care of by GSA.

The GSA Schedule is awarded as a prime contract entered into by the federal government and a vendor that has submitted an acceptable proposal. At the core of the GSA Schedule contract lie two key concepts: 1) Basis of Award customer or group of customers and 2) Price Reduction Clause. The two concepts are applied in concert to achieve the government's pricing objectives for the GSA Schedule program. Namely, the government wants to ensure that when the vendor experiences competitive pressures to reduce its pricing, then the government can benefit from these and be extended reduced pricing as well.

The Basis of Award customer or group of customers represents the customer or group of customers whose sales are affected on the same terms and conditions as those with GSA, and whose pricing is used: 1) as the baseline during negotiations to establish discounts offered to GSA, and 2) as a price floor that, when breached, constitutes additional discounting that triggers the Price Reduction Clause.

The Price Reduction Clause ensures that vendor discounting practices and GSA Schedule prices maintain a fixed relationship. The vendor specifies in its GSA proposal, and during negotiations of GSA Schedule contract prices, the discounts to be given to Basis of Award customer(s). If the vendor then provides a larger discount to a Basis of Award customer than what was agreed upon in the GSA Schedule contract (i.e., if the price floor is breached), then the vendor's GSA price will be reduced proportionately and retroactively.

Effective Price Reduction Clause compliance procedures will protect vendors if their discounting practices are fully and accurately disclosed in their original proposals to GSA, and then are used as a basis for compliance over the term of the contract. Although not ideal, a compliance system implemented after a contract has been awarded can bring a contract into compliance, although sometimes at the expense of profits. If implementing a system in the middle of a contract period, inaccuracies that turn up should be corrected immediately, and the GSA contracting officer should be made aware of them. Price Reduction Clause compliance systems and procedures can range from simple to complex. A simple, manual system would be appropriate for a service contractor with standard labor rates that are not discounted. A complex system would be required for a reseller with thousands of products and discounting policies that differ among product groups.

In response to increased mandates and standards required by the Federal Government of its agencies and in a push to plan for federal sustainability, GSA offers online tools to aid in the building and management of government offices that are subject to these requirements.

GSA has delegated authority to the Department of Veterans Affairs (VA) to procure medical supplies under the VA Federal Supply Schedules Program.

In 2018, GSA awarded federal government debt collection services to IC System.

Federal property and buildings

The Public Buildings Service (PBS) acquires and manages thousands of federal properties. In accordance with Title 40 of the United States Code, GSA is charged with promulgating regulations governing the acquisition, use, and disposal of real property (real estate and land) and personal property (essentially all other property). This activity is centered in GSA's Office of Governmentwide Policy. Policies promulgated by GSA are developed in collaboration with federal agencies and are typically published for public comment in the Federal Register before publication as a Final Rule.

The Public Buildings Service provides workplaces for federal customer agencies, and United States courthouses at good economies to the American taxpayer. PBS is funded primarily through the Federal Buildings Fund, which is supported by the rent from federal customer agencies.

The Office of Property Disposal within the Public Buildings Service manages the disposal of surplus real property. The Office is responsible for property which includes land, office buildings, warehouses, former post offices, farms, family residences, commercial facilities, or airfields located in the United States, Puerto Rico, the U.S. Virgin Islands, or the U.S. Pacific Territories. Surplus property is made available to both government and private bidders and, in some cases, land sold for public purposes (such as parks or welfare) may be made available for a discount of up to 100% of the fair market value.

GSA has earned a LEED rating for 24 green buildings. Some of green offerings at new buildings includes green roofs (planted roofs that can substantially reduce rainwater run-off during storms and provide significant insulation for the buildings), underfloor air distribution (that delivers cooling and heating air at floor level instead of from the ceiling), purchasing and using renewable power from utility companies, and light shelves (located outside of the building that reduce the amount of heat radiating into the building from the sun while increasing the amount of natural light and high ceilings that help direct daylight deep into the work environment). The American Recovery and Reinvestment Act of 2009 made available not less than $4.5 billion for measures necessary to convert GSA facilities to High-Performance Green Buildings, as defined in the Energy Independence and Security Act of 2007 (Public Law 110-140).

The Department of Energy's Federal Energy Management Program facilitates to GSA the implementation, through project transaction services, applied technology services, and decision support services, to deploy renewable energy technologies and cultivate change to embrace energy efficiency.

In 2004, GSA was presented with the Honor Award from the National Building Museum for "success in creating and maintaining innovative environments for the federal community as well as providing a positive federal presence for the public".

Federal vehicle fleet management

GSA contributes to the management of U.S. Federal property, including a 215,000 vehicle motor pool.

The American Recovery and Reinvestment Act of 2009 (stimulus bill) included $300 million to acquire energy-efficient motor vehicles for the federal fleet. President Barack Obama announced that GSA was to support the U.S. auto industry with orders for about 17,600 new fuel-efficient vehicles by June 1, 2009, on an accelerated schedule, with money from the American Recovery and Reinvestment Act. GSA was to pay $285 million to General Motors Corporation, Chrysler LLC, and Ford Motor Company. It was to include 2,500 hybrid sedans—the largest one-time purchase yet of hybrid vehicles for the federal government—and each new vehicle was claimed to yield at least a 10% fuel economy improvement over its predecessor. GSA was to spend $15 million more that year on a pilot fleet of advanced-technology vehicles, including all-electric vehicles and hybrid buses.

Hybrids accounted for about 10 percent of the 145,473 vehicles the U.S. General Services Administration bought during the fiscal years 2009 and 2010, after making up less than 1 percent of government vehicle purchases in 2008. As for specific models, Obama took a buy-American stance. The U.S. government bought about two-thirds of the Chevrolet Malibu Hybrids sold during the past two years, and almost a third of the Ford Fusion Hybrids, but only 17 Toyota Prius hybrids and five Honda Civic Hybrids. Ground Force One, so designated when transporting the POTUS, is one of two armored buses procured in 2010 for the transportation of dignitaries under protection of the Secret Service, at a cost of $1.1 million each. The coaches were assembled in Tennessee on frames made in Canada.

Interagency Resources Management Conference

The Interagency Resources Management Conference (IRMCO) was a federal executive conference of the General Services Administration, hosting about 300 federal and industry leaders each year. The Interagency Resources Management Conference began in 1961 as the ADPCO conference. In 1979, the Department of Commerce, GSA, and the Office of Management and Budget (OMB) jointly sponsored a conference for Senior Executive Service (SES) officials at Gettysburg, Pennsylvania. At the same time, the National Archives hosted a small records management conference for senior executives, also located in Gettysburg. These two conferences merged with ADPCO and became The Interagency Resources Management Conference. Over the years, the conference has evolved its focus from highly specialized to integrated. In 1996, when U.S. Congress mandated the role of chief information officer (CIO), these new federal executives were invited to attend The Interagency Resources Management Conference.

The Interagency Resources Management Conference was the government's primary senior executive conference when it was held as an offsite retreat for leaders from across the government. Originally, industry participation was managed by a division of The Washington Post, Post-Newsweek Tech Media, and from 1999 to 2008, Post-Newsweek, with the assistance of a small, woman-owned business, Hosky Communications Inc., developed a strong following from the SES community for the event, on average generating 300–400 attendees with a 3:1 government to industry ratio.

In 2008, Hosky was awarded a competitive contract to continue to manage and develop the forum. From 2008 to 2010, IRMCO drew attendees from about 65 federal agencies and diverse disciplines, including information technology, human resources, acquisition, management, and finance.

Once travel restrictions and budget concerns surfaced in late 2010, IRMCO was moved to a local venue under the management services of A-S-K Associates, where primary attendance by industry was established as a means to inform commercial firms on GSA policies. IRMCO 2011 was held in Washington, D.C., at the Kellogg Conference Center and Hotel on the campus of Gallaudet University.

Shortly after IRMCO 2011, GSA's Associate Administrator for Governmentwide Policy, Kathleen Turco, announced to the media that she and other GSA officials felt that IRMCO had lost its spark and retired from the event.

Technology Transformation Services

Beginning with the Federal Citizen Information Center in 1970, GSA has had a long history of connecting the public to government information and services. In 2009, a new Office of Citizen Services and Innovative Technologies (now the Office of Products and Programs) was created to expand the effort to serve the public through technology. GSA began managing the Presidential Innovation Fellows program the same year it launched 18F with a team focused on improving the federal government's digital services. The Centers of Excellence, introduced in October 2017, are working to accelerate the modernization of IT infrastructure and reduce legacy IT spending across the government.

Now all of those offices have joined forces under the Technology Transformation Services sub-unit of the Federal Acquisition Service. Its mission is to improve the lives of the public and public servants by transforming how the government uses technology. TTS aims to meet the government's technology needs: acquisition, omnichannel experience, intelligent process automation, infrastructure optimization and cloud, accelerators and innovation, data and analytics, and identity management.

TTS offices and programs also include:
 United States Digital Corps: Fellowship program for early-career technologists to launch impactful careers in public service and create a more effective, equitable government.
 TTS Solutions: A diverse portfolio of mature products and services that help agencies improve the delivery of information and services to the public.

Section 1122 Program
Section 1122 of the 1994 National Defense Authorization Act enabled state and local government agencies to purchase defense and other federal equipment to support drug enforcement activity. In 2009, the reauthorization bill expanded the program to purchases for use in homeland security and emergency response operations. The program is owned and managed by the Department of Defense (DOD), and equipment is made available by the Defense Logistics Agency (DLA) and GSA, as is also done under the 1033 program.

See also

 Building code
 Energy Efficiency and Conservation Block Grants
 Federal Building (disambiguation)
 Geographic Locator Codes
 GSA Advantage
 Public Works and Government Services Canada

References

External links
 
 GSA list of past administrators
 General Services Administration in the Federal Register
 GSA Schedule Contract in the Top 100 Contractors of the U.S. federal government

 
1949 establishments in Washington, D.C.
Government agencies established in 1949
Organizations based in Washington, D.C.
Sustainable building in the United States